Diego Sebastián Gómez (born 5 January 1984) is an Argentine former professional footballer who played as a striker.

References

External links

1984 births
Living people
Association football midfielders
Argentine footballers
FC Gueugnon players
Tours FC players
Angers SCO players
US Boulogne players
SO Cholet players
Bergerac Périgord FC players
Ligue 1 players
Ligue 2 players
Championnat National players
Championnat National 2 players
Argentine expatriate footballers
Argentine expatriate sportspeople in France
Expatriate footballers in France
Footballers from Rosario, Santa Fe